Roxanne Mary Chow (born October 31, 1979) is a Canadian retired soccer player who played as a defender. She made one international appearance for the Canada national team.

Early life and college career 
Born in Terrace, Chow started playing soccer at the age of five for the Terrace Youth Soccer Association (TYSA). She was part of the British Columbia women's soccer team that won gold at the 1997 Canada Games in Brandon, Manitoba.

Chow started her collegiate career at Simon Fraser University, where she helped her team reach two consecutive NAIA finals in 1997 and 1998. As a freshman, she started all 23 games for the Clan, assisting two goals. She earned NAIA First Team All-American and NAIA All-Tournament Team honours. The following year, after missing the first few games due to national team commitments, she made a total of 19 appearances, scoring one goal and adding two assists. At the end of the season, she was again selected as a NAIA First-Team All-American.

In 1999, Chow travelled to Belgium to train with the 1998 Belgian Women's First Division champions Eendracht Aalst. In the fall of 2000, she transferred to Wake Forest University. As a junior, she played in nine games, starting six. Before the Santa Clara tournament, she tore her ACL during a practice session; as a result, she underwent surgery twice and was sidelined for the remainder of the season. She never fully recovered from this injury, and the following year she only made six appearances (one start) for the Demon Deacons.

International career 
On August 2, 1998, at the age of 18, Chow made her first and only appearance for the Canada national team in Orlando, Florida, as she played the final 19 minutes in a 4–0 loss to the United States at the Citrus Bowl. Although she did not make any appearances at the 1998 CONCACAF Women's Championship, which took place a few weeks after her debut, she still received a medal.

The following year, she represented Canada at the 1999 Pan American Games, where the Canadian Soccer Association fielded an under-20 squad. She played in every game of the tournament.

Career statistics

International

Honours

National 
British Columbia
Canada Games: 1997

International 
Canada
CONCACAF Women's Championship: 1998

Individual 
NAIA First-Team All-American: 1997, 1998
NAIA All-Tournament Team: 1997

References

Notes

External links 

Roxanne Chow at Wake Forest University

1979 births
Living people
People from Terrace, British Columbia
Canada women's international soccer players
Canadian women's soccer players
Soccer people from British Columbia
Women's association football defenders
Footballers at the 1999 Pan American Games
Wake Forest Demon Deacons women's soccer players
Simon Fraser Clan women's soccer players